The Inkigayo Chart is a music program record chart on Seoul Broadcasting System (SBS) that gives an award to the best-performing single of the week in South Korea. The chart measures digital performance in domestic online music services (55%), social media via YouTube views (30%), album sales (10%), network on-air time (10%), advanced viewer votes (5%), and real-time voting via the Starpass mobile app (5%) in its ranking methodology.

In 2022, 20 singles achieved number one on the chart, and 15 acts were awarded first-place trophies. "Tomboy" by (G)I-dle achieved the highest score of the year, with 9,648 points on the April 3 broadcast. Eleven songs collected trophies for three weeks and earned a Triple Crown: Ive's "Eleven" and "Love Dive", Taeyeon's "INVU", Big Bang's "Still Life", Psy's "That That", (G)I-dle's "Tomboy" and "Nxde", Nayeon's "Pop!", Blackpink's "Pink Venom" and "Shut Down", and Younha's "Event Horizon".

Chart history

References 

2022 in South Korean music
South Korea Inkigayo
Lists of number-one songs in South Korea